Gangjinia is a Gram-negative and strictly aerobic genus of bacteria from the family of Flavobacteriaceae with one known species (Gangjinia marincola). Gangjinia marincola has been isolated from seawater from the Gangjin Bay.

References

Flavobacteria
Bacteria genera
Monotypic bacteria genera
Taxa described in 2011